Porocottus is a genus of marine ray-finned fishes belonging to the family Cottidae, the typical sculpins. These fishes are found in the northern and northwestern Pacific Ocean.

Taxonomy
Porocottus was first proposed as a monospecific genus in 1859 by the American biologist Theodore Gill when he described Porocottus quadrifilis from the Bering Strait. The 5th edition of Fishes of the World classifies the genus Artediellus within the subfamily Cottinae of the family Cottidae, however, other authors classify the genus within the subfamily Myoxocephalinae of the family Psychrolutidae.

Species
There are currently nine recognized species in this genus:
 Porocottus allisi (D. S. Jordan & Starks, 1904)
 Porocottus camtschaticus (Schmidt, 1916)
 Porocottus coronatus Yabe, 1992
 Porocottus japonicus Schmidt, 1935
 Porocottus leptosomus Muto, Y. Choi & Yabe, 2002
 Porocottus mednius (T. H. Bean, 1898) (Pored sculpin)
 Porocottus minutus (Pallas, 1814)
 Porocottus quadrifilis Gill, 1859
 Porocottus tentaculatus (Kner, 1868)

References

Cottinae
Taxa named by Theodore Gill